Paul Bonar (born 28 December 1976 in Glasgow) is a Scottish former professional footballer, who played for Airdrieonians, Raith Rovers, Ayr United, Albion Rovers and Stenhousemuir in the Scottish Football League.

References

External links

1976 births
Living people
Footballers from Glasgow
Scottish footballers
Airdrieonians F.C. (1878) players
Raith Rovers F.C. players
Ayr United F.C. players
Sligo Rovers F.C. players
Albion Rovers F.C. players
Stenhousemuir F.C. players
Scottish Football League players
Association football defenders
Scotland under-21 international footballers
Kirkintilloch Rob Roy F.C. players
Scottish Junior Football Association players